Eric Warner Holle (born September 5, 1960) is a former American football defensive lineman who played four seasons with the Kansas City Chiefs of the National Football League (NFL). He was drafted by the Kansas City Chiefs in the fifth round of the 1984 NFL Draft. He played college football at the University of Texas at Austin and attended Lyndon B. Johnson High School in Austin, Texas.

References

External links
Just Sports Stats

Living people
1960 births
Players of American football from Houston
American football defensive ends
Texas Longhorns football players
Kansas City Chiefs players